Pericoptus frontalis is a sand scarab native to New Zealand which inhabits sandy river banks and sandbars in inland Otago. It was first described by Thomas Broun in 1904. The European hedgehog is a predator of P. frontalis.

References

External links
Image of P. frontalis

Dynastinae
Beetles of New Zealand
Endemic fauna of New Zealand
Beetles described in 1904
Taxa named by Thomas Broun
Endemic insects of New Zealand